The Virtuous Wife; Or, Good Luck At Last is a 1679 comedy play by the English writer Thomas D'Urfey. It was originally performed by the Duke's Company at the Dorset Garden Theatre in London.

The original cast included Henry Harris as Beverly, William Smith as Beauford, Thomas Jevon as Sir Frolack Whimsey, Anthony Leigh as Sir Lubbery Widgeon, Cave Underhill as Amble, John Bowman as Crotchett, James Nokes as Lady Beardly, Elizabeth Barry as Olivia and Elizabeth Currer as Jenny Wheedle.

References

Bibliography
 Van Lennep, W. The London Stage, 1660-1800: Volume One, 1660-1700. Southern Illinois University Press, 1960.

1679 plays
West End plays
Plays by Thomas d'Urfey
Restoration comedy